The 2014–15 Arizona Wildcats men's basketball team represented the University of Arizona during the 2014–15 NCAA Division I men's basketball season. The team was led by sixth-year head coach Sean Miller and played home games at the McKale Center in Tucson, Arizona as a member of the Pac-12 Conference. They finished the season 34–4, 16–2 in Pac-12 play to win their second straight Pac-12 regular season championship title for 14th time. In the Pac-12 Tournament, the Wildcats defeated 8-seed California; 73–51 in the quarterfinal game, 4-seed UCLA; 70–64 in the semifinal game, and 2-seed Oregon; 80–52 in the championship game. The Wildcats won their first Pac-12 Tournament title for the fifth time since 2002. As the #2 seed in the West Region NCAA tournament, The Arizona Wildcats defeated the #15 seed Texas Southern; 93–72 in the round of 64, #10 seed Ohio State; 73–58 in the round of 32, 6-seed Xavier; 68–60 in the Sweet 16, advancing to the Elite 8 for second straight year, losing to 1-seed Wisconsin (the rematch from the NCAA tournament's Elite 8 loss in 1-point overtime last season); 85–78.

Previous season

The 2013–14 Arizona Wildcats team finished the season with an overall record of 33–5, and 15–3 in the Pac-12 to win their 13th Pac-12 regular season championship. In the Pac-12 tournament the Wildcats defeated Utah and Colorado to advanced to the Pac-12 Championship Game, where they lost to UCLA. The team received an at-large bid to the NCAA tournament as a 1–seed in the West Region, where they defeated 16-seed Weber State, 8-seed Gonzaga, and 4-seed San Diego State to advance to the Elite Eight, where they lost to 2-seed Wisconsin in overtime.

Off Season

Departures

Incoming Transfers

2014 Recruiting Class

Personnel

Roster

On January 6, 2015, Freshman forward Craig Victor II announced he would be transferring. Three days later, it was announced Victor would be transferring to LSU.

Depth chart

Coaching staff

Schedule
The team's non-conference schedule will include road games at UNLV and UTEP, home games against Mount St. Mary's, UC Irvine, Oakland, Gardner-Webb, Michigan, Gonzaga, Utah Valley and  Cal State Northridge (Maui Invitational opening game) and three neutral-site games as part of the 2014 Maui Invitational Tournament.  In conference play, the team will face neither the Washington teams at home nor the Los Angeles teams on the road.

|-
!colspan=12 style=| Exhibition

|-
!colspan=12 style=| Non-conference regular season

|-
!colspan=12 style=";"| 

|-
!colspan=12 style=";"| 

|-
!colspan=12 style=";"| NCAA tournament

Ranking movement

Player statistics
 As of March 28, 2015

Awards
 Stanley Johnson
 All-Freshman Team USBWA (2015)
 District IX All-District Team USBWA (2015)
 Pac-12 Freshman Player of the Year (2015)
 Pac-12 All-Freshman Team (2015)
 Pac-12 Tournament All-Tournament Team (2015)
 First-team All-Pac-12 (2015)
 2014 Maui Invitational MVP, All-Tournament Team
 2x Pac-12 Player of the Week (December 1, 2014, January 19, 2015)
 NCAA National Player of the Week (January 19, 2015)
 Wayman Tisdale National Freshmen of the Week (January 18, 2015)
 Wayman Tisdale National Freshmen of the Year Award Finalist
 Julius Irving Small Forward of the Year Award Finalist
 Julius Erving Small Forward of the Year (2015)
 Third-team USA Today All-American
 Rondae Hollis-Jefferson
 NCAA Tournament West Regional All-Tournament Team (2015)
 Pac-12 Tournament All-Tournament Team (2015)
 2014 Maui Invitational All-Tournament Team
 Pac-12 Player of the Week (February 16, 2015)
 Pac-12 All-Defensive Team (2015)
 First-team All-Pac-12 (2015)
 T. J. McConnell
 NCAA Tournament West Region All-Tournament Team (2015)
 Pac-12 Tournament All-Tournament Team (2015)
 District IX All-District Team USBWA (2015)
 NCAA National Player of the Week (March 9, 2015)
 First-team All-Pac-12 (2015)
 Pac-12 All-Defensive Team (2015)
 Bob Cousy Point Guard of the Year Award Finalist
 Brandon Ashley
 Pac-12 Tournament MVP (2015)
 All-Pac-12 Honorable Mention (2015)

See also
 2014–15 Arizona Wildcats women's basketball team

References

Arizona Wildcats men's basketball seasons
Arizona
Arizona
Arizona Wildcats
Arizona Wildcats
Pac-12 Conference men's basketball tournament championship seasons